The Curtiss R3C is an American racing aircraft built in landplane and floatplane form. It was a single-seat biplane built by the Curtiss Aeroplane and Motor Company.

The R3C-2 was a twin float seaplane built for the Schneider Trophy race. In 1925, it took place at Chesapeake Bay in Baltimore, Maryland. With , pilot Jimmy Doolittle won the trophy with a Curtiss R3C-2. The other two R3C-2s, piloted by George Cuddihy and Ralph Oftsie, did not reach the finish line. The next day, with the same plane on a straight course, Doolittle reached , a new world record.

Operators

United States Navy - two examples
United States Army Air Service - one example

Survivors

The R3C-2 that Jimmy Doolitle piloted to victory in the 1925 Schneider Trophy race is preserved at the National Air and Space Museum's Steven F. Udvar-Hazy Centre, at Washington Dulles Airport, Virginia. It still wears its '3' 1925 racing number.

Specifications (R3C-2)

In culture

 A Curtiss R3C appears in Hayao Miyazaki's animated movie Porco Rosso featuring a romanticized interwar aviation. The Curtiss R3C is flown by a pilot himself named Curtis. The dialogues also reference the 1925 Schneider Trophy.

See also
 Curtiss CR

References

Angelucci, Enzo. World Encyclopedia of Civil Aircraft. London:Willow Books, 1984. .
Bowers, Peter M. Curtiss Aircraft 1907–1947. London:Putnam, 1979. .
Swanborough, Gordon and Bowers, Peter M. United States Navy Aircraft since 1911. London:Putnam, 1976. .
 The Golden Age of Aviation – Curtiss R3C-2
 Pulitzer Trophy web site
 Schneider Trophy 1925 web site (french)
 German edition “Flugzeuge”, Enzo Angelucci, 1974 
 results of the Schneider Trophy from the Society of Air Racing Historians

External links

 The Curtiss R3C Page
 computer-designed picture (and photo) at www.hydroretro.net
 photo of the R3C-2 in the Smithsonian National Air and Space Museum

1920s United States sport aircraft
Aircraft first flown in 1925
Biplanes
R3C
Floatplanes
Racing aircraft
Schneider Trophy
Single-engined tractor aircraft